WTT or World TeamTennis is a mixed-gender professional tennis league.

WTT may also refer to:
 Warsaw Trade Tower
 WaterTower Theatre
 Working timetable 
 World Table Tennis (organization)
 World's tallest thermometer
 WTT HK, a telecommunication operator in Hong Kong
 wtt reduction, the weak truth-table reduction
 Wattle Glen railway station's station code
 Witton railway station's station code
 WTT, the Wahana Tri Tunggal at the Yogyakarta International Airport
 WTT, Wantoat Airport Wantoat's IATA airport code
 WTT, a water tanker/tender of the Buckinghamshire Fire and Rescue Service
 WTT, a weak-line T Tauri star
 WTT, Web Thermal Tables used in virial expansion calculations
 WTT, the ISU World Team Trophy in Figure Skating in figure skating records and statistics
 WTT, World-Transforming Technologies is a Latin America Foundation working with innovation technologies to overcome social and environmental challenges